Taira no Takamochi (平高望), born Prince Takamochi (高望王), was a former member of the Imperial Family demoted to nobility of the Heian period. He is the founder of the Taira clan and the Kanmu Heishi lineage of the clan.

Life 
Prince Takamochi was born as the son of Prince Takami, the third prince of Prince Kazurawara, and Tachibana no Harunari. Takamochi was the great-grandson of Emperor Kanmu, who reigned from 781 to 806.

He was granted the court rank of Junior Fifth Rank, Lower Grade and served as Vice Governor (suke kokushi) of Kazusa Province.

On May 13, 889, Takamochi was granted the surname Taira, thus establishing the Kanmu Heishi line of the Taira clan. This line proved to be the strongest and most dominant line during the Heian period.

Even after his retirement, he stayed in Kazusa Province and became a powerful figure in the Kantō region as a feudal lord, privately owning vast rice fields.

Genealogy 
Taira no Korihira, a great grandson of Takamochi, moved to Ise Province (currently part of Mie Prefecture) and established an important Daimyo dynasty.

Later, the Kanmu Heishi lineage had many branches, including Hōjō, Chiba, Miura and Hatakeyama clans.

Family 

 Father: Prince Takami
 Mother: Tachibana no Harunari
 Wife: Fujiwara no Yoshikata's daughter
 Eldest son: Taira no Kunika
 Second son: Taira no Yoshikane
 Third son: Taira no Yoshimasa
 Son: Taira no Yoshiyori
 Concubine
 Son: Taira no Yoshifumi
 Unknown mother
 Son: Taira no Yoshihiro
 Son: Taira no Yoshimochi
 Son: Taira no Yoshimasa
 Daughter: Fujiwara no Korechiyo's wife, Fujiwara no Tamenori's mother

References 

Taira clan
9th-century births
Year of death unknown
Japanese nobility
10th-century deaths
Imperial House of Japan